Ponparappi is a village in the Sendurai taluk of Ariyalur district, Tamil Nadu, India.

Demographics 
As per the 2001 census, Ponparappi had a total population of 4,614 with 2,300 males and 2,314 females.

References 

Villages in Ariyalur district